Maino Neri (30 June 1924 – 8 December 1995) was an Italian footballer and manager who played as a midfielder.

Club career
Neri was born in Carpi, Modena. After spending 10 years with local side Modena, and making a couple trips to Serie B and back, Neri at 27 years of age became part of Alfredo Foni's Inter. With the 'nerazzurri' he won two consecutive Serie A championships in four years before closing his career with Brescia, which played in Serie B.

International career
Neri debuted for the national team at the 1948 London Olympics wearing the captain's arm band in his first game (all eleven players were making their debut in the game against the U.S.) and played a total of eight caps, among which were games against Switzerland and Belgium at the 1954 World Cup. He was also a member of the Italian squad that took part at the 1952 Summer Olympics.

References

External links
 La Gazzetta dello Sport

1924 births
1995 deaths
Sportspeople from Carpi, Emilia-Romagna
Italian footballers
Association football midfielders
Modena F.C. players
Inter Milan players
Serie A players
Serie B players
Italy international footballers
Olympic footballers of Italy
Footballers at the 1948 Summer Olympics
Footballers at the 1952 Summer Olympics
1954 FIFA World Cup players
Italian football managers
Modena F.C. managers
S.S. Lazio managers
Como 1907 managers
Reggina 1914 managers
U.S. Lecce managers
Inter Milan non-playing staff
Footballers from Emilia-Romagna